The International University of Logistics and Transport in Wrocław, IULT (Polish: Międzynarodowa Wyższa Szkoła Logistyki i Transportu we Wrocławiu, MWSLiT) is a Private university established in 2001 in Wroclaw. The university was founded in cooperation with the French group École supérieure internationale de commerce (ESIDEC) in Metz.The university offers several majors: logistics, transport, civil engineering and management.

History 
The International University of Logistics and Transport in Wrocław was established in 2001 on the initiative of the Association for Building the Integrated Logistics Center in Wrocław.

The creation of the university in cooperation with the ESIDEC group was awarded the prize of the French Prime Minister in 2003 for the best European educational project, among 92 projects from the whole world. The IULT was also awarded the "Trusted school" certificate by the Academic Information Centre. Obtaining the accreditation to launch the Logistics postgraduate studies in 2007 was a milestone in the university's history.

Authorities 
Rector: Dr Marcin Pawęska
Dean: Dr Inż. Józef Puchalski
Chancellor Mgr Jolanta Czyż

Rectors 
2001-2002: Prof. Dr Hab. Inż. Zbigniew Korzeń
2002-2006: Prof. Dr Hab. Stanisław Marian Krawczyk
2006-2008: Dr Hab. Andrzej Wacław Bujak
2008-2012: Dr Janusz Zierkiewicz
2012-2017: Dr Inż. Zbigniew Sebastian
2017 – present: Dr Marcin Pawęska

Organizational structure 
The Faculty of Logistics and Transport
Logistics section
Transport section
Civil Engineering section
Management section
Additional sections
Computer science study center
Physical education center

List of Majors 
Logistics (undergraduate - 6 semesters), (engineering - 7 semesters), (postgraduate - 3 semesters)
Logistics (postgraduate with English as the language of instruction - 4 semesters)
Transport (undergraduate - 6 semesters)
Civil engineering (engineering - 7 semesters)
Management (undergraduate - 6 semesters)

In addition, the university offers various postgraduate courses:

International supply chains logistics
Roads and bridges utilization and maintenance
Railway utilization and maintenance
Logistics technician - forwarding technician
Logistics systems in trade and distribution
Strategic purchasing
Modern management of logistics and production
Cargo organization and management
Balanced management of construction investments
Local action groups manager

International Cooperation 
As a result of cooperation with the University of Lorraine, graduates receive two diplomas: a Polish one and a French one. Selected courses are taught in English. The IULT takes part in the Erasmus+ programme. The university is a part of the Cartagena Network of Engineers – an association of 70 universities around the world, involved in educating engineers. The International University of Logistics and Transport in Wrocław is the only university in the Central-Eastern Europe to be accredited by the Chartered Institute of Logistics and Transport in the UK - CILT (UK). Consequently, graduates receive the CILT (UK) certificate.

References 
"IULT history". Retrieved 2017-05-15
"Why IULT". Retrieved 2017-06-02
"MWSLiT laureatem certyfikatu Wiarygodna Szkoła". Retrieved 2017-06-02
"CILT (UK) certificate". Retrieved 2017-06-02

External links 
Official website (Polish)
Official website (English)

Universities and colleges in Wrocław
Technical universities and colleges in Poland
Educational institutions established in 2001
2001 establishments in Poland